Carrie Minetta Jacobs-Bond (August 11, 1862 – December 28, 1946) was an American singer, pianist, and songwriter who composed some 175 pieces of popular music from the 1890s through the early 1940s.

She is perhaps best remembered for writing the parlor song "I Love You Truly", becoming the first woman to sell one million copies of a song. The song first appeared in her 1901 collection Seven Songs as Unpretentious as the Wild Rose, along with "Just Awearyin' for You", which was also widely recorded.

Jacobs-Bond's song with the highest number of sales immediately after release was "A Perfect Day" in 1910. A 2009 August 29 NPR documentary on Jacobs-Bond emphasized "I Love You Truly" together with "Just Awearyin' for You" and "A Perfect Day" as her three great hits. Jacobs-Bond was inducted into the Songwriters Hall of Fame in 1970.

Personal life and death

Carrie Minetta Jacobs was born in Janesville, Wisconsin, to Dr. Hannibal Jacobs and his wife, Mary Emogene (or Emma) Davis Jacobs and was an only child. She was a distant cousin of John Howard Payne, the lyricist who wrote "Home Sweet Home." Jacobs was born in the house of her maternal grandparents at the corner of Pleasant Street (now W. Court Street) and Oakhill Avenue. Her father died while she was a child, and the family faced financial difficulties without him.
 Most of Jacob-Bond's family enjoyed playing music, and her father played the flute. Jacobs-Bond could pick out piano tunes at age 4, she could play some pieces just by hearing them at age 6, and then at age 8 she was able to play Liszt's Second Hungarian Rhapsody just by hearing it. She studied the piano from age 9 to age 17, with the dream to become a songwriter. As a child, she attended classes in the Janesville public school system.
 
During Jacobs' short-lived first marriage to Edward Smith J. Smith of Janesville, at age 18, her only child, Frederick Jacobs Smith, was born on July 23, 1882. This marriage ended in divorce in 1887.

Her second marriage in 1888 was to her childhood sweetheart, physician Frank Lewis Bond of Johnstown, Wisconsin. They lived in Iron River, Michigan, where she was a homemaker and supplemented the family income with painted ceramics, piano lessons, and her musical compositions. She lived among miners and loggers for several years and when the economy of the iron mining area collapsed, Frank had no money. Struck by a child's snowball, Dr. Bond fell on the ice, and died five days later from crushed ribs in 1895. She was left with debts too large to be covered by the $4,000 in proceeds of his life insurance, and she returned to Janesville. Selling ceramics, running a rooming house, and writing songs did not produce enough money to pay her bills. She slowly sold off their furniture and ate only once per day.

After achieving some success with her composing, Jacobs-Bond moved with her son to Chicago to be closer to music publishers. For several years while living in Chicago, most of her songs never made the transition from manuscript to being published, so she had to raise money by singing them at social gathering and concerts. Soon she found that people enjoyed her simple and lyrical music. Her lyrics and music exemplified sentimentality, which was intensely popular at that time. Because Jacobs-Bond's attempts to have her music published were repeatedly turned down by the male-dominated music industry of the day, in 1896 she resorted to establishing her own sheet music publishing company. As a result, she was one of very few women in the industry, and perhaps the only one, to own every word of every song she wrote. Her publishing company changed location eight times, finally settling in Hollywood, California, which is where she and her son moved to in the early 1920s to help ease the pains of her rheumatism, where she continued performing and publishing.

She named her home there "The End of the Road" (also the title of her 1940 book).  She was an early supporter of the Theatre Arts Alliance, which created the Hollywood Bowl near her home. Jacobs-Bond died in her Hollywood home of a cerebral hemorrhage on December 28, 1946, at the age of 85. She is buried in the "Court of Honor" at Forest Lawn Memorial Park Cemetery in Glendale, California.

Poetry and art
Carrie Jacobs-Bond also published books of children's poetry and an autobiography. Her autobiography The Roads of Melody was published in 1927. She drew the artwork for her sheet music covers. The wild rose, her trademark artwork, appears on many of her publications.

Legacy and honors
Former U.S. President Herbert Hoover wrote in her epitaph: "Beloved composer of 'I Love You Truly' . . . and a hundred other heart songs that express the loves and longings, sadness and gladness of all people everywhere . . .  who met widowhood, conquered hardship, and achieved fame by composing and singing her simple romantic melodies. She was America's gallant lady of song." The Los Angeles City Council honored her as "one of America's greatest women."

Music career

Carrie Jacobs-Bond studied piano with area teachers while a child. A performer named Blind Tom Wiggins toured the country, instantly memorizing any song played to him and then playing it back. After his part of the program, young Jacobs was prodded to go to the piano. She awed the crowd by playing back Blind Tom's song. She began writing music in the late 1880s when encouraged by her husband to "put down on paper some of the songs that were continually running through my mind." After her return from Iron River, Michigan, and the death of her second husband, she took up residence at 402 East Milwaukee Street, Janesville, Wisconsin, where she wrote the song "I Love You Truly".

A young female singer who lived across the hall from Jacobs-Bond had to leave unexpectedly, so she asked Jacobs-Bond to entertain her manager and another man. When the two men arrived, Jacobs-Bond invited the men into her apartment. The manager, Victor P. Sincere, saw some of her manuscripts lying around and asked whether she had written them. After Jacobs-Bond said yes, Sincere asked her to perform a song;, so she played "I Love You Truly" for him. When he asked whether she would like to have the song performed in public, she answered "no" because she had not copyrighted the song, and someone could steal it. Jacobs-Bond had second thoughts, so she went to the telephone at the corner drugstore and called opera star Jessie Bartlett Davis, even though they had never met. Jacobs-Bond hoped that Davis would make the song as popular as she had "Oh Promise Me" (by Reginald De Koven and Clement Scott) in 1898. Davis volunteered to pay the cost to publish Seven Songs as Unpretentious as the Wild Rose.

After moving to Chicago, Jacobs-Bond slowly gathered a following by singing in small recitals in local homes. She published her first collection with the help of opera star Jessie Bartlett Davis. Seven Songs: as Unpretentious as the Wild Rose, which was released in 1901, included two of her most enduring songs—"I Love You Truly" and "Just Awearyin' for You". The success of Seven Songs allowed Jacobs-Bond to expand her publishing company, known as the Bond Shop, which she had originally opened with her son in her apartment in Janesville. Before the end of 1901, David Bispham augmented Jacobs-Bond's celebrity by giving a recital of exclusively Jacobs-Bond songs in Chicago's Studebaker Theatre.
Within a few years and with the help of her friends, Jacobs-Bond performed for Theodore Roosevelt. She gave a recital in England (with Enrico Caruso) and a series of recitals in New York City.

She collaborated with American poet Paul Laurence Dunbar. In 1906 they published five songs with lyrics by Dunbar and music by Jacobs-Bond.

In 1910 she published "A Perfect Day", for which 25 million copies of the sheet music were sold. It was the most popular of her compositions during her lifetime although "I Love You Truly" was more frequently performed later.

During World War I Jacobs-Bond gave concerts in Europe for U.S. Army troops. "A Perfect Day" was especially popular among them.

She was invited again to Washington to perform at a White House State Dinner given by President Harding for the Members of the Supreme Court on February 2, 1922.

Carrie Jacobs-Bond was the most successful woman composer of her day, by some reports earning more than $1 million in royalties from her music before the end of 1910. In 1941, the General Federation of Women's Clubs cited Jacobs-Bond for her contributions to the progress of women during the 20th century.

One of her final compositions titled Because of the Light was published in December 1944, when she was 82. Composer Rolande Maxwell Young later revised and updated some of Jacobs-Bond's songs for Boston Music Co.

Jacobs-Bond's life and lyrics serve as testimony to her resilience in overcoming hardships such as poverty, her father's early death, her divorce, her second husband's death, and her son's suicide in 1932 while listening to "A Perfect Day" on the phonograph.

Published works

Sheet music

Almost Impossible
The Angelus
At Morning, Noon and Night
A Bad Dream
Because I Am Your Friend
Because of the Light
Betty's Music Box.
The Bird Song
Birds
The Blue Flag, 1917
But I Have You
California
Chimney Swallows
Come, Mr. Dream-maker, 1897
Compensation
Consolation
A Cottage in God's Garden
The Crimson-Breasted Bird
Cupid's Home
The Dark Lament
The Dear Auf Wiedersehn
De Las' Long Res', 1901
Des Hold My Hands Tonight, 1901
Do You Remember, 1915
The Elopement
The End of a Perfect Day
Evening, My Love and You
First Ask Yourself
The Flying Flag
The Forget Me Not
The Free Concert
The Gate of Tears
God Remembers When the World Forgets, 1913
Going to Church with Mother
The Golden Key
The Good Folk
Good Night
Got to Practice, 1917
The Hand of You
Happy Lil Sal
Have You Seen My Kitty?
His Buttons Are Marked 'U.S.', 1902
His Lullaby
Hollyhocks
Homeland
A Hundred Years from Now, 1914
Hush-a-by
I Love You Truly, 1901 & 1906
I was Dreaming... Maybe
If I Could Hear Your Voice Again
I'm the Captain of the Broom Stick Cavalry, 1890
In a Foreign Land
In Dear Hawaii, 1908
In My Garden
In the Meadow, 1925
Is My Molly Dead?, 1895
Is Yo'? Yo' Is, 1905
I've Done My Work, 1920
Jesus Is Calling
June and December
Just Awearyin' for You, 1901
Just by Laughing
Just Lonesome
Keep Awake
Know and Find
Lazy River
Life's Garden
The Lily and the Rose
Linger Not
A Little Bit O'Honey, 1917
The Little House
Little Lost Youth of Me.
A Little Pink Rose, 1912
A Little Shoe
Lively Hour
Long Time Ago
Longing
Look Up
Love and Sorrow

Lovely Hour
Love's Sacred Trust
The Lure
May I Print a Kiss?
Memories of Versailles Waltz
A Memory
Men and Women
Morning and Evening
Mother Mine
Mother's Cradle Song, 1895
Mother's Three Ages of Man
Movin' in de Bes' Soci'ty.
My Dear
My Garden of Memory
My Son!
My Soul
The Naughty Little Girl
Nothin' but Love!
Nothing but a Wild Rose
Now and Then
O Haunting Memory.
O Time Take Me Back, 1916
Old Friends of Mine
Out in the Fields
Over Hills and Fields of Daisies
The Pansy and the Forget-Me-Not
Parting, 1901
A Perfect Day, 1910
Play Make Believe
Please
Remember to Forget
Robin Adair
Roses Are in Bloom
The Sandman, 1912
Shadows, 1901
A Sleepy Song
Smile a Little
Someone I Love is Coming
A Song of the Hills
The Soul of You
Still Unexprest', 1901
Stop and Sing
A Study in Symbols
Sunshine (Po Li'l Lamb)
Ten Thousand Times Ten Thousand
There Is a Way
Through the Mists
Through the Years, 1918
Time Make All but Love the Past
Tis Summer in Thine Eyes
To-Day.
To My Valentine, 1926
To the Savior Called
To the Victor (March)
To Understand
Trouble
Two Lovers
Tzigani Dances
Until Death
Until God's Day
A Vision
Walking in Her Garden
Waltz of the Wild Flowers, 1916
The Way of the World
We Are All Americans, 1918
Were I
When Church is Out
When do I Want You Most?
When God Puts Out the Light
When I am Dead, My Dearest
When I Bid the World Goodnight
When My Ships Come to Me
When You're Sad
Where Youth's Eternal
Who is True?
Why
Write to Me Often, Dear, 1896
Your Song

Song books

Eleven Songs, 1897
Mother's Cradle Song
Write to Me Often, Dear
Come, Mr. Dream-Maker
The Pansy and the Forget Me Not
Who is True
June and December
Someone I Love Is Coming
Through the Mists
Until Death
Four Songs, 1899
A Little Shoe
Have You Seen My Kitty?
The Bird Song
When My Ships Come Home
Seven Songs as Unpretentious as the Wild Rose, 1901
Shadows w.m. Jacobs-Bond, pp. 3–5
Parting w. William Ordway Prestridge m. Jacobs-Bond, pp. 6–7
Just Awearying for You w. Frank Lebby Stanton m. Jacobs-Bond, pp. 8–9
De Las' Long Res' w. Paul Laurence Dunbar m. Jacobs-Bond, p. 10
I Love You Truly w.m. Jacobs-Bond, p. 11
Still Unexprest w.m. Jacobs-Bond, pp. 12–13
Des Hold My Hands Tonight w.m. Jacobs-Bond, pp. 14–15
Two Songs, 1902
May I Print a Kiss
Two Lovers
Twelve Songs, 1902
A Bad Dream
I Was Dreaming... Maybe
Linger Not
Love's Sacred Trust
Mother's Three Ages of Man
Over Hills and Fields of Daisies
The Dear Auf Wiedersehn
Time Make All But Love the Past
When I Am Dead, My Dearest
When I Bid the World Goodnight
Three Songs, 1904
Nothing But a Wild Rose
The Angelus
Walking in Her Garden

Ten Songs, 1905
In a Foreign Land
Just By Laughing
Men and Women
My Dearest Dear
When Do I Want You Most?
Where to Build Your Castles
Two Songs, 1907
Happy Lil Sal
Trouble
Half Minute Songs or Miniature Songs, 1910
Making the Best of It
First Ask Yourself
To Understand
Doan' Yo' Lis'n
How to Find Success
The Pleasure of Giving
Answer the First Rap
A Good Exercise
A Present From Yourself
Now and Then
When They Say the Unkind Things
Keep Awake
The Smile Songs, 1910
Know and Find
Look Up
Mother Mine
Please
A Memory
Smile a Little
Stop and Sing
The Good Folk
The Way of the World
There Is a Way
Why
Almost Impossible
Little Kitchen Songs and Stories, 1911
Thirty Songs: Songs Everybody Sings, about 1927

Autobiography
Jacobs-Bond, Carrie. The Roads of Melody: My Story. New York: D. Appleton and Company, 1927. 224 pp.

Poetry

Short Stories

Notes

Further reading
Becker, Janet Hattersley and Maude Haben Luck. Spark of Melody: The Life and Music of Carrie Jacobs-Bond.  [Madison]: Dept. of Debating and Public Discussion, Univ. Extension Div., Univ. of Wisconsin, 1944. 
Bernhardt, Marcia A. Carrie Jacobs-Bond: As Unpretentious As the Wild Rose. Caspian, MI: Bernhardt, 1978.  
Bruce, Phyllis Ruth. From Rags to Roses: The Life and Works of Carrie Jacobs-Bond, an American Composer.  Thesis (M.A.)--Wesleyan University, 1980.  
Carrie Jacobs-Bond. Madison, Wis: Demco Library Supplies, 1939.   
Good, Machelle. Carrie Jacobs-Bond: Her Life and Music. Thesis (M.M.)--Butler University, 1984.  
Jacobs-Bond, Carrie. A Perfect Day and Other Poems: From the Songs of Carrie Jacobs Bond.  Joliet, Ill: P.F. Volland Co, 1926. 
Jacobs-Bond, Carrie. The Roads of Melody. New York: D. Appleton and Co, 1927. 
Morath, Max. I Love You Truly: A Biographical Novel Based on the Life of Carrie Jacobs-Bond. New York: iUniverse, 2008.

External links

 
 
"America's First Great Woman Popular Song Composer" — Biography from ParlorSongs.com by Rick Reublein
 by Robin & The Giant on their program Notables.
Guide to the Carrie Jacobs-Bond Collection, 1885–2001 at the University of Colorado at Boulder
Carrie Jacobs-Bond collection, circa 1896-circa 1944 (Library of Congress)
Carrie Jacobs-Bond in the Songwriters Hall of Fame from ASCAP
Carrie Jacobs-Bond lyrics at the Lied and Art Song Texts Page

Sheet music for "The Hand of You", 1920.
Sheet music for "A Perfect Day", 1910.
Sheet music for "Doan' yo' lis'n", 1908.
Sheet music for "I Love You Truly", 1906.
Four Songs songbook, 1899.
 Just Awearyin' for You recorded by Evan Williams (1867–1918) 
 Carrie Jacobs-Bond recordings at the Discography of American Historical Recordings.

1862 births
1946 deaths
American women composers
American women writers
Burials at Forest Lawn Memorial Park (Glendale)
Elegiac poets
Singers from Chicago
Singers from Wisconsin
People from Janesville, Wisconsin
People from Iron River, Michigan
Vaudeville performers
Writers from Wisconsin
Writers from Chicago
20th-century American singers
20th-century American women singers
20th-century American composers
20th-century women composers